Bhausaheb Firodiya High School and Junior College is a school in western India, in the city of Ahmednagar.

History
The school was known as Government High School when it was started in 1848. When the Ahmednagar Education Society (AES) was established by Mahadev Govind Ranade, the school was named A.E. Society High School in 1889. It was named Bhausaheb Firodiya High School on 9 July 1973 after Bhausaheb Firodiya, an industrialist and politician.

Campus 

The school is in the heart of the city near old municipal corporation office. The current building was built in 1950/1951. The school has 43 classrooms from grades 5 to 12.

Mone Kala Mandir 

The school has an open-air theatre in its center. It was previously used for commercial purposes and is now used for annual gatherings.

Library 
The school library has more than 25,000 books and a large reading hall.
New library was built in year 2015

Staff

Principal 

High schools and secondary schools in Maharashtra
Education in Ahmednagar district